Torrefarrera is a village and municipality in the province of Lleida and autonomous community of Catalonia, Spain. The  municipality is split in two parts, the south-eastern part having nearly all the population.

References

External links
 Government data pages 

Municipalities in Segrià